Once Again is a 2020 South Korean family drama television series starring Lee Sang-yeob and Lee Min-jung. The drama aired on KBS2 from March 28 to September 13, 2020, every Saturday and Sunday from 19:55 to 21:15 (KST).

Synopsis
Song Young-dal (Cheon Ho-jin) and Jang Ok-boon (Cha Hwa-yeon) have been married for many years and they have four children (a son and three daughters): Joon-sun (Oh Dae-hwan), Ga-hee (Oh Yoon-ah), Na-hee (Lee Min-jung) and Da-hee (Lee Cho-hee).

Third child Na-Hee is a doctor and she works with her husband Doctor Yoon Gyu-jin (Lee Sang-yeob) at the same hospital. They fell in love during their medical school days and got married, but their marriage life is not doing very well. Meanwhile, the first child Joon-sun (Oh Dae-hwan) and the second child Ga-hee (Oh Yoon-ah) are both divorcees and live with their parents. The youngest child Da-Hee struggles as an intern at a company.

Cast

Main
 Chun Ho-jin as Song Young-dal
 Cha Hwa-yeon as Jang Ok-boon
 Lee Min-jung as Song Na-hee — Young-dal and Ok-boon's third child, a pediatrician.
 Lee Sang-yeob as Yoon Gyu-jin — Na-hee's husband, an internist.

Supporting
 Oh Dae-hwan as Song Joon-sun — Young-dal and Ok-boon's eldest child.
 Oh Yoon-ah as Song Ga-hee — Young-dal and Ok-boon's second child. 
 Lee Cho-hee as Song Da-hee — Young-dal and Ok-boon's youngest child.
 Moon Woo-jin as Kim Ji-hoon — Ga-hee's son.

Yoon Gyu-jin's family
 Sung Chan-ho as Gyu-jin and Jae-seok's deceased father, only appears in their family photo.
 Kim Bo-yeon as Choi Yoon-jung — Gyu-jin and Jae-seok's mother.
 Lee Sang-yi as Yoon Jae-seok — Gyu-jin's younger brother, Da-hee's love interest, later her husband.

Yongju Market
 Lee Jung-eun as Kang Cho-yeon — Sister's Kimbap store owner. Young-dal's long-lost younger sister, Song Young-sook.
 Baek Ji-won as Jang Ok-ja — Ok-boon's unmarried younger sister.
 Ahn Gil-kang as Yang Chi-soo — Young-dal's friend.
 Ki Do-hoon as Park Hyo-shin — Song's family fried chicken restaurant part-time delivery man, later became a stuntman for Joon-sun's action company. Ga-hee's love interest.
 Kim So-ra as Lee Joo-ri — Sister's Kimbap store worker.
 Song Da-eun as Kim Ga-yeon — Sister's Kimbap store worker.
 Shin Mi-young as Park Kyung-hwa — Dried fish store owner.
 Kim Ga-young as Im Jin-joo — Twisted donut store owner.

Family of Joon-sun
 Im Jung-eun as Sung Hyun-kyung — Joon-sun's wife.
 Lee Ga-yeon as Song Seo-young — Joon-sun's eldest daughter.
 Ahn Seo-yeon as Song Seo-jin — Joon-sun's younger daughter.

Members of Evergreen Children's Hospital
 Alex Chu as Lee Jeong-rok — Na-hee's medical school senior.
 Son Seong-yoon as Yoo Bo-young — Gyu-jin's first love.
 Song Min-jae as Yoo Shi-hoo — Bo-young's son.
 Shin Soo-jung as Park Ji-yeon
 Kang Yoo-seok as Han Gi-young
 Kim Hyun-mok as Hong Sung-woo
 Kim Mi-eun as Shin Hye-jung
 Lee Sang-kyung as Shim Jung-hee
 Han Bom as Oh Yeon-ji

Others
 Oh Eui-shik as Oh Jung-bong — Joon-sun's action junior, a stuntman.
 Jang Won-hyuk as Lee Jong-soo — Joon-sun's action junior, a stuntman.
 Bae Ho-geun as Kim Seung-hyun — Ga-hee's ex-husband.
 Heo Hyun-ho as Monk Yong Kang — Monk who is a father figure to Cho-yeon.
 Kim Hye-won as Kwon Ji-hye — Ga-hee's store manager.
 Jung Han-bit as Seo Yoon-hee — Jae-seok's blind date.
 Jo Mi-ryung as Hong Yeon-hong — Cho-yeon's friend, a schemer and troublemaker.
 Nam Jung-hee as Shim Moon-sil — Yeon-hong's mother.

Special appearances
 Ji Il-joo as Cha Young-hoon — Da-hee's ex-fiancé.
 Son Jong-hak as Jang Choong-soo — Evergreen Children Hospital's director.
 Lee Sung-kyung as Ji Sun-kyung — Jae-seok's ex-girlfriend.
 Kang Chan-hee as Choi Ji-won — Da-hee's friend from college.
 Jo Han-chul as Jo Won-chul — Loan shark that harasses Yeon-hong for her debts.
 Lee Pil-mo as Lee Hyun — Hyun Media CEO, film director for Yongju Market's promotional video.

Viewership
 In this table,  represent the lowest ratings and  represent the highest ratings.
 N/A denotes that the rating is not known.
The 48th episode of the series aired on September 6, 2020, logged a national average viewership of 37.0% with 6.8 million viewers watching the episode.

Awards and nominations

Original soundtrack

Track listings

Notes

References

External links
  
 
 
 

Korean Broadcasting System television dramas
2020 South Korean television series debuts
2020 South Korean television series endings
Korean-language television shows
South Korean romantic comedy television series
Television series by Studio Dragon
Television series by Bon Factory Worldwide